WZFI-LP (98.5 FM) was a radio station licensed to Bridgeton, New Jersey.

History
The call sign WZFI-LP was assigned on 2004-03-10. The station's license was cancelled on June 2, 2022, due to the station's owners failing to file a license renewal application.

Translators
In addition to the main station, WZFI-LP was relayed by a translator to widen its broadcast area.

References

External links
 

ZFI-LP
ZFI-LP
Radio stations established in 2004
2004 establishments in New Jersey
Radio stations disestablished in 2022
2022 disestablishments in New Jersey
Defunct radio stations in the United States
Defunct religious radio stations in the United States
ZFI-LP